Vicent Philipo Mayombya (born 3 January 1993) is a Tanzanian football player who plays for Lipuli. He was selected for the 2019 Africa Cup of Nations squad.

References

1993 births
Living people
Tanzanian footballers
Tanzania international footballers
Association football defenders
2019 Africa Cup of Nations players
Lipuli F.C. players
Tanzanian Premier League players